Bantrel Co. is a Canadian private corporation owned by Bechtel Corporation and McCaig Investments. Bantrel's core business is in Engineering, Procurement, and Construction Management in the Canadian Marketplace. Bantrel is active in Canada's energy sector, and is a supplier of engineering services to oil sands developers in Alberta. In addition to oil sands, Bantrel is also engaged in refining, power generation, gasification, and pipeline construction projects.

Bantrel was established in 1983 and is currently one of Canada's largest EPC firms. As of 2006, 2,611 people were employed by Bantrel. Headquartered in Calgary, AB, Bantrel also has offices in Edmonton, AB and Toronto, ON.

Bantrel's wholly owned subsidiary company, Bantrel Constructors Co., is a self-executing construction company, focusing on large industrial projects. Bantrel Management Services Co. is Bantrel's sister company, which provides construction management oversight and expertise.

History

Oil Sands
Bantrel's parent company, Bechtel Corporation, was involved in oil sands development early. Bechtel designed and constructed the Great Canadian Oil Sands upgrader in 1962, which is now Suncor Energy. Bechtel also developed Syncrude's upgrading facilities.

Bechtel transferred the oil sands portfolio to Bantrel in 1983.

Past Projects
Husky Bi-Provincial Upgrader
Newfoundland Transshipment Terminal
Nova Chemicals Ethylene and Polyethylene Complex
Encana Foster Creek Cogeneration
Suncor Millenium
Petro-Canada Edmonton Diesel Desulphurization
Suncor Genesis
Petro-Canada Refinery Conversion
Suncor Voyageur Upgrader
Reliance Jamnagar Refinery
Shell Scotford Upgrader Expansion 1

References

External links

Corporate websites
 main site - Bantrel
 parent company - Bechtel

Construction and civil engineering companies of Canada
Companies based in Calgary
Construction and civil engineering companies established in 1993
Canadian companies established in 1993